Birkerthwaite is a village on Birker Fell, Eskdale, Cumbria, England.

See also

List of places in Cumbria

External links

Villages in Cumbria
Borough of Copeland